Sarıtaş is a village in the Baskil District of Elazığ Province in Turkey. The village is populated by Kurds of the Parçikan tribe and had a population of 94 in 2021.

The hamlets of Ballıca, Bozarmut, Foduluşağı, Heybeli, Kalecik, Sekman and Taşören are attached to the village.

References

Villages in Baskil District
Kurdish settlements in Elazığ Province